This is a list of conflicts in North America. This list includes all countries starting northward from Northern America (Canada, Greenland, and the United States of America), southward to Mesoamerica (Mexico) and the Caribbean (Cuba, Haiti, Jamaica, Grenada, Saint Martin, the Dominican Republic, and the Republic of Trinidad and Tobago) and further south to Central America (Panama, Belize, Costa Rica, El Salvador, Guatemala, Honduras, and Nicaragua). Conflicts are ordered by geographic regions of North America ranging from north to south, and then arranged chronologically from the Pre-Columbian era (specifically: the classic and postclassic periods of Mesoamerica) to the postcolonial period. This list includes (but is not limited to) the following: wars of independence, liberation wars, colonial wars, undeclared wars, proxy wars, territorial disputes, and world wars. Also listed might be any battle that was itself only part of an operation of a campaign of a theater of a war. There may also be periods of violent civil unrest listed, such as: riots, shootouts, spree killings, massacres, terrorist attacks, and civil wars. The list might also contain episodes of: human sacrifice, mass suicide, and genocides.

Northern America

Bermuda

As a British Colony Bermuda served as a staging point for Great Britain during the American Revolution and War of 1812. During the Battle of the Atlantic the island served as an allied airbase for Anti-submarine warfare submarine hunters. NATO also used Bermuda as a base during the Cold War.

Canada

11th century 

1000s Norse colonization of the Americas
1003 First Battle of Vinland
1010 Second Battle of Vinland

16th century

1534 Battle of Bae de Bic
1540-1924 American Indian Wars
1577 Skirmishes between English sailors under Martin Frobisher and Inuit on Baffin Island

17th century 

1600s Beaver Wars
1610 Battle of Sorel
1628 Action of 17 July 1628
1644 Action at Ville-Marie
1649 Raid on St. Ignace and St. Louis
1660 Battle of Long Sault
1689 Lachine massacre
1691 Battle of La Prairie
1692 Mohawk Valley raid
1600s Anglo-French conflicts
1613 Battle of Port Royal
1628 Capture of Tadoussac
1628 Naval action in the St. Lawrence River
1629 Capture of Quebec
1629 Siege of Baleine
1630 Siege of Fort St. Louis
1632 Raid on St. John
1640 Battle of Port Royal
1654 Battle of Port Royal
1686 Hudson Bay expedition
1688 Battle of Fort Albany
1640–1701 French and Iroquois Wars
1692 Battle of Fort Vercheres
1643–1650 Acadian Civil War
1643 Battle of Port Royal
1645 Battle of Fort La Tour
1674 Dutch Occupation of Acadia
1677 Battle of Port La Tour
1689–1697 King William's War
1689 Battle of the Lake of Two Mountains
1690 Battle of Coulée Grou
1690 Battle of Port Royal
1690 Battle at Chedabucto
1690 Battle of Quebec
1693 Battle of Fort Albany
1694 Capture of York Factory
1696 Naval action in the Bay of Fundy
1696 Raid on Chignecto
1696 Siege of Fort Nashwaak
1696–1697 Avalon Peninsula Campaign
1696 Siege of Ferryland
1696 Raid on Petty Harbour
1696 Siege of St. John's
1697 Battle of Carbonear
1697 Battle of Hudson's Bay

18th century 

1702–1713 Queen Anne's War
1702 Raid on Newfoundland
1704 Raid on Chignecto
1704 Raid on Grand Pré
1705 Siege of St. John's
1707 Siege of Port Royal
1709 Battle of St. John's
1709 Battle of Fort Albany
1710 Siege of Port Royal
1711 Battle of Bloody Creek
1722–1725 Father Rale's War
1722 Battle of Winnepang
1723 Raid on Canso
1724 Raid on Annapolis Royal
1725 Raid on Canso
1744–1748 King George's War
1744 Raid on Canso
1744 Siege of Fort Anne
1745 Siege of Port Toulouse
1745 Siege of Louisbourg
1746 Battle at Port-la-Joye
1747 Battle of Grand Pré
1749–1755 Father Le Loutre's War
1749 Raid on Dartmouth
1749 Siege of Grand Pre
1749–1750 Battles at Chignecto
1750 Battle at St. Croix
1751 Raid on Dartmouth
1751 Raid on Chignecto
1751 Raids on Halifax
1753 Attack at Country Harbour
1754–1763 Seven Years' War
1755 Naval Action off Newfoundland
1755 Battle of Fort Beauséjour
1755 Bay of Fundy Campaign
1755 Battle of Petitcodiac
1756 Raid on Lunenburg
1757 Battle on Snowshoes
1757 Battle of Bloody Creek
1758 Siege of Louisbourg
1758 Battle of Fort Frontenac
1758 Gulf of St. Lawrence Campaign
1758 Île Saint-Jean Campaign
1758 Petitcodiac River Campaign
1758 Battle on Snowshoes – occurred in the British Province of New York and New France.
1759 St. John River Campaign
1759 Battle of Beauport
1759 Battle of the Plains of Abraham
1759 St. Francis Raid
1760 Battle of Sainte-Foy
1760 Siege of Quebec
1760 Battle of Restigouche
1760 Montreal Campaign
1760 Battle of the Thousand Islands
1762 Battle of Signal Hill
1763–1766 Pontiac's War
1763 Battle of Point Pelee
1775–1776 American Revolutionary War
1775 Invasion of Canada
1775 Arnold's expedition to Quebec
1775 Battle of Longue-Pointe
1775 Siege of Fort St. Jean
1775 Battle of Quebec
1776 Battle of the Cedars
1776 Battle of Saint-Pierre
1776 Battle of Trois-Rivières
1776 Battle of Fort Cumberland
1777 Siege of Saint John
1781 Naval battle off Cape Breton
1782 Naval battle off Halifax
1782 Raid on Lunenburg
1782 Hudson Bay Expedition
1789 Nootka Crisis
1792 Destruction of Opitsaht
1793 Raids on Pine Island Fort
1792–1797 War of the First Coalition
1796 Newfoundland expedition

19th century 

1800 United Irish Uprising
1811 Tonquin incident
1812 War of 1812
1812 Raid on Gananoque
1812 Battle of Queenston Heights
1812 Naval action off Kingston
1812 Battle of Lacolle Mills
1813 Raid on Elizabethtown
1813 Battle of York
1813 Battle of Fort George
1813 Battle of Stoney Creek
1813 Battle of Beaver Dams
1813 Capture of the Growler and the Julia
1813 Battle of Chateauguay
1813 The "Burlington Races"
1813 Battle of River Canard
1813 Battle of the Thames
1813 Massequoi Village
1813 Battle of Crysler's Farm
1814 Battle of Longwoods
1814 Battle of Lacolle Mills
1814 Battle of Odelltown
1814 Raid on Port Dover
1814 Capture of Fort Erie
1814 Battle of Chippawa
1814 Battle of Lundy's Lane
1814 Siege of Fort Erie
1814 Engagements on Lake Huron
1814 Action at Nottawasaga
1814 Capture of the Tigress and the Scorpion
1814 Capture of Fort Erie
1814 Siege of Fort Erie
1814 Battle of Cook's Mills
1814 Battle of Malcolm's Mills
1816 Pemmican War
1816 Capture of Fort Gibraltar
1816 Battle of Seven Oaks
1816 Capture of Fort Douglas
1816 Capture of Fort William
1835–1845 Shiners' War
1837–1838 Lower Canada Rebellion
1837 Battle of Saint-Denis
1837 Battle of Saint-Charles
1837 Battle of Saint-Eustache
1838 Battle of Lacolle
1838 Battle of Odelltown
1838 Battle of Beauharnois
1837–1838 Upper Canada Rebellion
1837 Battle of Montgomery's Tavern
1838 Battle of Pelee Island
1838 Short Hills Raid
1838 Battle of the Windmill
1838 Battle of Windsor
1838 Aroostook War
1838 Nicola's War
1849 Courthouse Rebellion
1849 Montreal Riots
1849 Stony Monday Riot
1858 Fraser Canyon Gold Rush skirmishes along the Okanagan Trail
1858 Fraser Canyon War
1859 McGowan's War
1859 Pig War
1863 Lamalcha War
1864 Chilcotin War
1864 Kingfisher Incident
1866–1871 Fenian Raids
1866 Battle of Ridgeway
1866 Battle of Fort Erie
1866 Battle of Pigeon Hill
1870 Battle of Eccles Hill
1870 Battle of Trout River
1867 Grouse Creek War
1869–1870 Red River Rebellion
1870 Wolseley Expedition
1870 Battle of the Belly River
1873 Cypress Hills Massacre
1885 North-West Rebellion
1885 Battle of Duck Lake
1885 Frog Lake Massacre
1885 Battle of Fort Pitt
1885 Battle of Fish Creek
1885 Battle of Cut Knife
1885 Battle of Batoche
1885 Battle of Frenchman's Butte
1885 Battle of Loon Lake
1886 Anti-Chinese Riots
1887 Wild Horse Creek War

20th century 
1902 – June 22: Toronto Streetcar Strike riot 
1907 – Anti-Oriental Riots (Vancouver)
1913 – Vancouver Island War
1918 – Conscription Crisis of 1917
1918 – Vancouver General Strike
1919 – Winnipeg General Strike
1925 – New Waterford Rebellion. See Davis Day.
1926 – Regina Riots
1933 – August 16: Christie Pits riot in Toronto.
1935 – The On-to-Ottawa Trek and Regina Riot.
1935 – The Battle of Ballantyne Pier
1938 – Bloody Sunday
1939–1945 – Second World War
1939–1945 – Battle of the Atlantic
1942–1944 – Battle of the St. Lawrence
1942 – Bombardment of Estevan Point lighthouse
1944 – Terrace Mutiny
1945 – Halifax Riot on Victory in Europe Day.
1955 – Richard Riot
1967 – Yorkville, Toronto summer street sit-ins and "riots".
1969 – Murray-Hill riot
1970 – FLQ – October Crisis
1971 – Gastown Riots
1982 – October 14: The Squamish Five, bombs a Litton Industries factory.
1983 – Solidarity Crisis
1990 – July 11 to September 26: Oka Crisis
1990–1992 – Strike, strike-breaking, and bombing at Royal Oak Mines in Yellowknife, NWT
1993 – June 9: Montreal Stanley Cup Riot
1994 – June 14: Vancouver Stanley Cup Riot
1995 – Gustafsen Lake Standoff
1995 – Ipperwash Crisis
1997–2000 – Wiebo Ludwig and his followers bomb wellheads in Alberta's oil country

21st century 

 February 28, 2006 – July 2011 Caledonia land dispute
 2009 Vancouver gang war
 January 22 — February 23, 2022 Canada convoy protest

Greenland 

Early 1400s Possible Thule-Norse Greenlander Conflict
1939-1945 Greenland in World War II

United States 

This includes all conflicts that have taken place within the modern territory of the United States.

See also
List of conflicts in the United States
List of incidents of civil unrest in the United States
List of rampage killers in the Americas
List of wars involving the United States
United States military casualties of war

Puerto Rico

Puerto Rico is geographically located within the Caribbean; however, because Puerto Rico territory of the United States the island's conflicts are listed here.

1511 Taino rebellion
1568–1648 Eighty Years' War
September 24, 1625 Battle of San Juan
1868 Grito de Lares
April 25 – August 12, 1898 Spanish–American War
May 12, 1898 Bombardment of San Juan
June 22, 1898 Second Battle of San Juan
June 28, 1898 Third Battle of San Juan
1898 U.S. invasion of Puerto Rico through Guanica in the south of the island

Precolonial

This includes all known conflicts that occurred within the territory of the United States of America prior to European exploration. 
1140-1150 Collapse of Early Pueblo culture in Chaco Canyon  
1200–1650 Chiefly Warfare Cult
1300 Fall of Cahokia
1325 Crow Creek massacre

American Indian Wars

This list covers all wars regarding Native Americans and First Nations within the 49 continental states of the United States (does not include territories) and the 10 provinces and 3 territories of Canada. This includes conflicts fought between American Indian and First Nation tribes and wars against encroachment from European Colonial Powers or the United States and Canada. Generally American Indian Wars classifies all conflicts for Native Americans and First Nations between 1540 and 1924 however this list also includes 20th century incidents on Indian Reservations.

1540-1542 Herando de Soto's Expedition
1609–1701 Beaver Wars
February 1692 Mohawk Valley raid
1610–1646 Anglo-Powhatan Wars
1610–1614 First Anglo-Powhatan War
1622–1632 Second Anglo-Powhatan War
1644–1646 Third Anglo-Powhatan War
1634–1638 Pequot War
1640 French and Iroquois Wars
1643 Kieft's War
1659 First Esopus War
1663 Second Esopus War
1675–1678 King Philip's War
1680 Pueblo Revolt
1689–1697 King William's War
1702–1713 Queen Anne's War
1706–1877 Comanche Wars
1711-1715 Tuscarora War
1715–1717 Yamasee War
1744–1748 King George's War
1760-1850 Russian Colonization of the Americas
1784 Awa'uq Massacre
1804 Battle of Sitka 
1763 Pontiac's Rebellion
1774 Dunmore's War
1776-1795 Cherokee-American wars
1785–1795 Northwest Indian War
Tecumseh's War 1811-1813
1811 Battle of Tippecanoe 
1813–1814 Creek War
1816–1858 Seminole Wars
1820–1875 Texas–Indian wars
August 1823 Arikara War
1832 Black Hawk War
1835–1842 Second Seminole War
1842 1842 Slave Revolt in the Cherokee Nation
1846–1866 Navajo Wars
1849–1924 Apache Wars
Victorio's War
Renegade period of the Apache Wars 1881-1924 
Geronimo's War 1881-1886 
1849–1923 Ute Wars
1849–1855 Jicarilla War
1850-1880 California Indian Wars
1850–1851 Mariposa War

 Sioux Wars 1854–1891
August 19, 1854 Grattan massacre
1862 Dakota War
1863–1865 Colorado War::*August 1 – September 24, 1865 
Powder River Expedition
1866–1868 Red Cloud's War
1876-1877 Great Sioux War
December 29, 1890 – January 15, 1891 Ghost Dance War
December 29, 1890 Wounded Knee Massacre
1855–1856 Yakima War
February 1856 Tintic War
1857–1858 Utah War
1859–1860 Mendocino War
1860 Paiute War
1862 Dakota War
1865–1872 Black Hawk War
1872–1873 Modoc War
1879 White River War
1898 Battle of Sugar Point
March 1914 – March 11, 1915 Bluff War
March 20–23, 1923 Posey War
February 27 – May 8, 1973 Wounded Knee incident
June 26, 1975 Pine Ridge Shootout

17th century

This covers all conflicts in the 1600s that occurred between rival European Colonial Powers, or between Colonists and their Colonial Administration. This section does not include conflicts regarding Native Americans.

August 27, 1664 The annexation of New Netherland by the English
English conquest of New Amsterdam (New York City)
1665–1667 Second Anglo-Dutch War
June 1667, a Dutch warship attacked Old Point Comfort
1672–1674 Third Anglo-Dutch War
August 1673 The Dutch recaptured New Netherland
November 1674 The Treaty of Westminster concluded the war and ceded New Netherland to the English
1676 Bacon's Rebellion
September 1688 – September 1697 King William's War
June 27, 1689 Raid on Dover
August 2–3, 1689 Siege of Pemaquid
March 27, 1690 Raid on Salmon Falls
May 20–21, 1690 Battle of Fort Loyal
January 24, 1692 Raid on York
June 10–13, 1692 Raid on Wells
July 18, 1694 Raid on Oyster River
August 14–15, 1696 Siege of Pemaquid
March 15, 1697 Raid on Haverhill

18th century

This covers all conflicts in the 1700s that occurred between rival European Colonial Powers, or between the early United States against European Colonial Powers. Many of the wars in this period were extensions of wars from continental Europe. This section does not include conflicts regarding Native Americans.

1701–1714 Queen Anne's War
October 7–18, 1702 Battle of Flint River
November 10 – December 30, 1702 Siege of St. Augustine
August 10 – October 6, 1703 Northeast Coast Campaign
February 29, 1704 Raid on Deerfield
January 25–26, 1704 Apalachee massacre
September 1706 Charles Town expedition
August 12 – November 30, 1707 Siege of Pensacola
August 29, 1708 Raid on Haverhill
Slave Revolts in Colonial English America
1712 New York Slave Revolt of 1712
1739 Stono Rebellion 
December 16, 1740 – October 18, 1748 King George's War
July 19 – September 5, 1745 Northeast Coast Campaign
November 28, 1745 Raid on Saratoga
August 19–20, 1746 Siege of Fort Massachusetts
April 7–9, 1747 Siege of Fort at Number 4
*1754–1763 The French and Indian War
Was fought within both Canada and the United States
May 28, 1754 Battle of Jumonville Glen
July 3, 1754 Battle of Fort Necessity
June 16, 1755 Battle of Fort Beauséjour
July 9, 1755 Braddock Expedition
1755 Battle of Lake George
April 18, 1756 Battle of Great Cacapon
August, 1756 Battle of Fort Oswego
September 8, 1756 Kittanning Expedition
January 21, 1757 Battle on Snowshoes
July 26, 1757 Battle of Sabbath Day Point
August 9, 1757 Battle of Fort William Henry
March 23, 1758 Battle on Snowshoes
July 27, 1758 Battle of Louisburg
August, 1758 Battle of Fort Frontenac
July 8, 1758 Battle of Carillon
September 14, 1758 Battle of Fort Duquesne
October 12, 1758 Battle of Fort Ligonier
November 25, 1758 Forbes Expedition
1759 Battle of Ticonderoga
1759 Battle of Fort Niagara
July 31, 1759 Battle of Beauport
1762 Battle of Signal Hill
 1764–1771 War of the Regulation
 1774–1776 Boston campaign
 1775–1776 Invasion of Canada
 1776 New York Campaign
 1777 Saratoga Campaign
 1779 Sullivan Expedition
1775–1783 American Revolutionary War

April 19, 1775 Battle of Lexington and Concord
April 20, 1775 – March 17, 1776 Siege of Boston
May 10, 1775 Capture of Fort Ticonderoga
June 11–12, 1775 Battle of Machias
June 17, 1775 Battle of Bunker Hill
August 8, 1775 Battle of Gloucester
August 23 – November 3, 1775 Siege of Fort St. Jean
September 24, 1775 Battle of Longue-Pointe
November 14, 1775 Battle of Kemp's Landing
November 28 – December 9, 1775 Battle of Great Bridge
February 27, 1776 Battle of Moore's Creek Bridge
March 2–4, 1776 Fortification of Dorchester Heights
March 2–3, 1776 Battle of the Rice Boats
May 15–26, 1776 Battle of the Cedars
June 8, 1776 Battle of Trois-Rivières
August 27, 1776 Battle of Long Island
September 15, 1776 Landing at Kip's Bay
September 16, 1776 Battle of Harlem Heights
October 11, 1776 Battle of Valcour Bay
October 28, 1776 Battle of White Plains
December 26, 1776 Battle of Trenton
January 3, 1777 Battle of Princeton
July 5–6, 1777 Siege of Fort Ticonderoga
August 6, 1777 Battle of Oriskany
August 16, 1777 Battle of Bennington
September 11, 1777 Battle of Brandywine
September 19, 1777 Battle of Freeman's Farm
October 2, 1777 Battle of Germantown
October 7, 1777 Battle of Bemis Heights
October 17, 1777 Battle of Saratoga
May 25, 1778 Battle of Freetown
June 28, 1778 Battle of Monmouth
June 30, 1778 Battle of Alligator Bridge
July 27, 1778 First Battle of Ushant
August 29, 1778 Battle of Rhode Island
February 23–25, 1779 Battle of Vincennes
July 16, 1779 Battle of Stony Point
July 24 – August 12, 1779 Penobscot Expedition
August 29, 1779 Battle of Newtown
October 9, 1779 Siege of Savannah
January 16, 1780 Battle of Cape St. Vincent
March 29, 1780 Siege of Charleston
August 8, 1780 Battle of Piqua
August 16, 1780 Battle of Camden
October 7, 1780 Battle of King's Mountain
January 17, 1781 Battle of Cowpens
March 15, 1781 Battle of Guilford Court House
 
September 6, 1781 Battle of Groton Heights
September 8, 1781 Battle of Eutaw Springs
September 28 – October 19, 1781 Siege of Yorktown*
December 12, 1781 Second Battle of Ushant
February 17, 1782 Battle of Sadras
April 9–12, 1782 Battle of the Saintes
August 19, 1782 Battle of Blue Licks
1794 Whiskey Rebellion
Slave Revolts in Spanish Louisiana 
1791 Mina's Conspiracy
1795 Pointe Coupee Conspiracy

19th century

This covers all conflicts in the 1800s that occurred between the governments of North America that took place within the modern territory of the United States of America and conflicts between North American and European states. This does not include conflicts regarding Native Americans.

*1812–1814 War of 1812
December 1812,Siege of Detroit
1813 Battle of Lake Erie 
1813 – August 1814 Creek War
August 24, 1814 Battle of Bladensburg
 August 24, 1814 Burning of Washington
November 7–9, 1814 Battle of Pensacola
December 13, 1814 Action of 13 December 1814 (Louisiana Campaign)
December 14, 1814 Battle of Lake Borgne
January 9–18, 1815 Siege of Fort St. Philip
January 13–14, 1815 Battle of Fort Peter
Battle of New Orleans - August, 1815
August 21–23, 1831 Nat Turner's Slave Rebellion 
*1835–1836 Texas Revolution
October 2, 1835 Battle of Gonzales
October 10, 1835 Battle of Goliad
November 4, 1835 Battle of Lipantitlán
October 28, 1835 Battle of Concepción
November 26, 1835 Grass Fight
October 12 – December 11, 1835 Siege of Béxar
February 27, 1836 Battle of San Patricio
March 2, 1836 Battle of Agua Dulce
February 23 – March 6, 1836 Battle of the Alamo
March 12–15, 1836 Battle of Refugio
March 19–20, 1836 Battle of Coleto
April 21, 1836 Battle of San Jacinto
1838 Missouri Mormon War
1844–1846 Illinois Mormon War
*1846–1848 Mexican–American War
August 13 – September 30, 1846 Siege of Los Angeles
1854–1858 Bleeding Kansas
1856 Sacking of Lawrence
1856 Pottawatomie Massacre
October 29, 1859 John Brown's Raid on Harper's Ferry
*1861–1865 American Civil War
February 11–16, 1862 Battle of Fort Donelson
April 6–7, 1862 Battle of Shiloh
August 28–30, 1862 Second Battle of Bull Run
September 17, 1862 Battle of Antietam
December 31, 1862 – January 2, 1863 Battle of Stones River
April 30 – May 6, 1863 Battle of Chancellorsville
July 1–3, 1863 Battle of Gettysburg
July 13–16, 1863 New York City draft riots
September 19–20, 1863 Battle of Chickamauga
May 5–7, 1864 Battle of the Wilderness
May 8–21, 1864 Battle of Spotsylvania Court House
April 7, 1864 Battle of Appomattox Court House
November 15, 1864 - December 21, 1865 Sherman's March to the Sea
June 9, 1864 - March 25, 1865 Siege of Petersburg
1865–1866 Fenian Raids
1878 Lincoln County War
1881 Gunfight at the O.K. Corral
1887-1894 Hatfield-McCoy Feud
1892 Homestead Strike

20th Century

This covers all conflicts and terrorist attacks in the 1900s that occurred within the modern territory of the United States of America. This also includes attacks upon the United States from Eurasian powers.

1910–1919 Border War
April 20, 1914 Ludlow Massacre
1914–1918 World War I
April 21, 1914 Ypiranga incident
July 30, 1916 2:08:00 AM (AST; GMT−4) Black Tom explosion
January 11, 1917 Kingsland Explosion
August 2–3, 1917 Green Corn Rebellion
July 21, 1918 Attack on Orleans
August 7, 1918 Battle of Ambos Nogales
May 31 – June 1, 1921Tulsa race riot
1912–1921 West Virginia coal wars
September 10–21, 1921 Battle of Blair Mountain
1939–1945 World War II

October 16, 1940 – May 21, 1941 Machita Incident
December 7, 1941 Attack on Pearl Harbor (Not in North America)
February 23, 1942 Bombardment of Ellwood
February 24–25, 1942 Battle of Los Angeles
June 3, 1942 – August 15, 1943 Battle of the Aleutian Islands
June 21, 1942 Bombardment of Fort Stevens
July 27, 1942 Lordsburg Killings
September 9–29, 1942 Lookout Air Raids
May 30, 1943 Zoot Suit Riots
August 14, 1944 Fort Lawton Riot
March 12, 1945 Santa Fe Riot
April 16, – September 17, 1945 Project Hula
July 8, 1945 Midnight Massacre
May 2–4, 1946 Battle of Alcatraz
August 1–3 Battle of Athens (1946)
August 11–17, 1965 Watts Rebellion
July 23–27, 1967 1967 Detroit riot
May 4, 1970 Kent State shootings
September 9, 1971 Attica Prison riot
May 13, 1985 MOVE bombing in Philadelphia
April 29, 1992 Los Angeles riots
August 21–31, 1992 Ruby Ridge standoff
February 28 – April 19, 1993 Waco siege
April 11–21, 1993 Lucasville Prison Riot
April 19, 1995 Oklahoma City bombing
February 28, 1997 North Hollywood shootout
 March 19 – 20, 1997 Heaven's Gate mass suicide

21st century

This includes domestic conflicts and terrorist attacks that took place within the United States. Note that actions of terrorism and domestic conflict are distinguished from one another.

2001–2021 War on Terrorism
September 11, 2001 September 11 attacks
May 8, 2007 Fort Dix attack plot
November 5, 2009 Fort Hood shooting
April 15, 2013 Boston Marathon bombing
April 2, 2014 Fort Hood shootings
 April 5, 2014 - May 2014 Bundy standoff
January, 1 - February 16, 2016 Occupation of the Malheur National Wildlife Refuge
June 8, 2020 - July 1, 2020 Capitol Hill Autonomous Zone

Middle America

Mexico

Pre-Columbian

 537 – 838 Tikal-Calakmul wars
 537 – 572 First Tikal-Calakmul War
 650 – 695 Second Tikal-Calakmul War
 720 – 744 Third Tikal-Calakmul War
circa 1250–1325 Conflict between the city-states of Tizaapan and Culhuacán ending with the Mexica driven away from Tizaapan to form Tenochtitlan in Lake Texcoco in 1325
circa 1325–1426 Conflict between the alliance of Tenochtitlan and Azcapotzalco against the city-state of Texcoco, ending in victory for the Tepanec empire
1376–1395 Acamapichtli, the first tlatoani of Tenochtitlan, sent expeditions to fight for Azcapotzalco against various city states, notably Chalco, Cuahnahuac, Xochimilco
1396–1417 Huitzilihuitl, the second tlatoani of Tenochtitlan, assisted in the conquest and sacking of the cities of Tultitlan, Cuauhtitlan, Chalco, Tollantzingo, Xaltocan, Otompa and Acolman
1418 Tezozomoc's war with Ixtlilxochitl I of Texcoco
1426 Tepanec Civil War
1427 Maxtla, ruler of Coyoacán incited a rebellion among the nobles of Azcapotzalco and usurped the throne
1427–1440 Allying with Nezahualcoyotl of Texcoco, Itzcoatl went on to defeat Maxtla and end the Tepanec domination of central Mexico
1480 – 1510 Saltpeter War
1428–1521 Formation and expansion of the Aztec Triple Alliance.
1430–1440 Successful campaigns against Xochimilco, Mixquic, Cuitlahuac, and Tezompa would secure agricultural resources for Tenochtitlan and, along with the conquest of Culhuacan and Coyoacán, would cement the Triple Alliance's control over the southern half of the Valley of Mexico.
1454-1519 Flower war
1440–1458 Reign of Moctezuma I
Subjugated the Huastec people and Totonac peoples
1458 Moctezuma I led an expedition into Mixtec territory against the city-state of Coixtlahuaca
Campaigns conducted against Cosamaloapan, Ahuilizapan, and Cuetlachtlan
1455 - 1516 Aztec-Tarascan Border Conflict
1473 Axayacatl subjugated Tlatelolco
1481–1486 Tizoc, the seventh tlatoani of Tenochtitlan, put down a rebellion of the Matlatzincan peoples of the Toluca Valley
1486–1502 Ahuizotl began his reign by suppressing a Huastec rebellion, and then conquered the Mixtec and the Zapotec

16th century

1502–1520 Through warfare Moctezuma II expanded the territory of the Aztec Empire as far south as Xoconosco in Chiapas and the Isthmus of Tehuantepec, and incorporated the Zapotec and Yopi people into the empire

1516 Texcoco Civil War
1519–1521 Spanish conquest of the Aztec Empire
The Cholula Massacre of 1519
Siege of Tenochtitlan (May 26 – August 13, 1521)
1527–1546 Spanish conquest of Yucatán
1533–1933 Mexican Indian Wars
1533 Yaqui Wars
1540 Conquest of Cíbola
1540 Tiguex War
1540–1542 Mixtón War
1550–1590 Chichimeca War
1599 Acoma Massacre

17th century

1601 Acaxee Rebellion
1616 Tepehuán Revolt
1641–1924 Apache–Mexico Wars
1641–1864 Navajo Wars
1680 Pueblo Revolt

18th century

1751 Pima Revolt
1757 First Magdalena Massacre

19th century

1821–1870 Comanche–Mexico Wars
1847–1901 Caste War of Yucatán
1810–1821 Mexican War of Independence
1835–1836 Texas Revolution

1861–1867 French intervention in Mexico

20th century

1910–1921 Mexican Revolution
1926–1929 Cristero War
1958–1959 Mexico–Guatemala conflict
1964–1982 Mexican Dirty War
1968 Mexican Movement of 1968
1968 Tlatelolco massacre
1971 El Halconazo
1994–present Chiapas conflict
 1994 Zapatista uprising
 1995 1995 Zapatista Crisis
 2005–2006 The Other Campaign

21st century

1992– War on Drugs
December 11, 2006– Mexican Drug War
December 11, 2006– Operation Michoacán
January 2, 2007– Operation Baja California
2008– Operation Sinaloa
2007– Joint Operation Nuevo León-Tamaulipas
November 5, 2010 Shootout at Matamoros, 50–100 killed
August 24, 2010 San Fernando massacre
April 6, 2011 – June 7, 2011 San Fernando massacre
August 25, 2011 Monterrey casino attack
June 25, 2010 Nuevo León mass graves
2008– Operation Chihuahua
February 2009 –  Operation Quintana Roo
July 16, 2011 – August 4, 2011 Operación Lince Norte
June 25, 2010 Nuevo León mass graves
August 24, 2010 San Fernando massacre
November 5, 2010 Shootout at Matamoros, 50–100 killed
April 6, 2011 – June 7, 2011 San Fernando massacre
June 3, 2011 Coahuila mass graves
August 25, 2011 Monterrey casino attack
August 28, 2011 – October 31, 2011 Operación Escorpión
June 25, 2010 Nuevo León mass graves
August 24, 2010 San Fernando massacre
November 5, 2010 Shootout at Matamoros, 50–100 killed
April 6, 2011 – June 7, 2011 San Fernando massacre
August 25, 2011 Monterrey casino attack
June 3, 2011 Coahuila mass graves
2011 – present Mexican Indignados Movement
2017 2017 Mexican protests

Central America

Guatemala 
378 A war of conquest: Tikal against Uaxactun
1524–1697 Spanish conquest of Guatemala

1530 Alvarado enslaves the Mayan kingdoms of Cakchiquel, Mam, and Ixil.
1533–1933 Mexican Indian Wars
1811 1811 Independence Movement
1823–1838 Federal Republic of Central America Independence and annexation by the Mexican Empire
1896–1898 Greater Republic of Central America
1954 1954 Guatemalan coup d'état
 1958–1959 Mexico–Guatemala conflict
1960–1996 Central American crisis
1960–1996 Guatemalan Civil War
1993 1993 Guatemalan constitutional crisis
2015 2015 Guatemalan protests
2020 2020 Guatemalan protests

Nicaragua 
1898–1934 Banana Wars
September 19, 1912 Battle of Masaya
October 3–4, 1912 Battle of Coyotepe Hill
May 16, 1927 Battle of La Paz Centro
July 16, 1927 Battle of Ocotal
July 25, 1927 Battle of San Fernando
July 27, 1927 Battle of Santa Clara
September 19, 1927 Battle of Telpaneca
October 9, 1927 Battle of Sapotillal
January 1, 1928 Battle of Las Cruces
February 27–28, 1928 Battle of El Bramadero
May 13–14, 1928 Battle of La Flor
December 31, 1930 Battle of Achuapa
September 16, 1932 Battle of Agua Carta
December 26, 1932 Battle of El Sauce
1926–1927 Nicaraguan civil war
1960–1996 Central American crisis
1961–1990 Nicaraguan Revolution
1988 Operation Golden Pheasant
2014–present 2014–2020 Nicaraguan protests
2018–present 2018–2021 Nicaraguan protests
2018 April 19 University Movement

Costa Rica 
March 12 – April 24, 1948 Costa Rican Civil War
January 1958 Calderonista invasion of Costa Rica
2018 2018 Costa Rican protests

El Salvador 
1533–1933 Mexican Indian Wars
1969 Football War
1960–1996 Central American crisis
1972 1972 Salvadoran coup d'état attempt
1979–1992 Salvadoran Civil War
October 15, 1979 1979 Salvadoran coup d'état
January 10–26, 1981 Final offensive of 1981 (El Salvador)
January 1981 Battle of Ilopango Airport
November 11–12, 1989 Final offensive of 1989
2020 2020 Salvadoran political crisis
2021 2021 Salvadoran political crisis

Honduras 
1533–1933 Mexican Indian Wars
1963 1963 Honduran coup d'état
1960–1996 Central American crisis
1969 Football War
1988 Operation Golden Pheasant
2009 2009 Honduran coup d'état
2017–2018 2017–2018 Honduran protests
2019 2019 Honduran protests

Panama 
1960 — 1996 Central American crisis
1968 — 1971 Insurgency in Chiriquí
1989 — 1990 United States invasion of Panama
December 20, 1989 Capture of Torrijos Airport
December 20, 1989 Operation Acid Gambit
December 20, 1989 Raid at Renacer Prison
December 20, 1989 Battle of Rio Hato Airfield
December 20, 1989 Battle of Paitilla Airport
December 20—23, 1989 Operation Nifty Package

Belize 
1533–1933 Mexican Indian Wars
1981 Heads of Agreement Crisis

Caribbean 

All conflicts which occurred on the islands in the Caribbean Sea are listed here.  US Territories such as Puerto Rico and the US Virgin Islands are exceptions to this rule as they included in the United States' Section.

Dominican Republic 
1519–1533 Enriquillo rebelled against the Spaniards
1585–1604 Anglo-Spanish War
January 1, 1586 Battle of Santo Domingo
February 1–11, 1904 Santo Domingo Affair
1916–1924 United States occupation of the Dominican Republic
1965–1966 Dominican Civil War
1965 Battle of Duarte Bridge

Cuba 
1524–1530 Guamá led a rebellion against Spanish rule in Cuba
1568–1648 Eighty Years' War
September 7–8, 1628 Battle in the Bay of Matanzas
October 10, 1868 – 1878 Ten Years' War
April 25 – August 12, 1898 Spanish–American War
April 25, 1898 Action of 25 April 1898
May 8, 1898 First Battle of Cárdenas
May 11, 1898 Battle of Cárdenas
May 11, 1898 Battle of Cienfuegos
June 6–10, 1898 Battle of Guantánamo Bay
June 13, 1898 Action of 13 June 1898
June 24, 1898 Battle of Las Guasimas
June 30, 1898 First Battle of Manzanillo
June 30, 1898 Battle of Tayacoba
July 1, 1898 Battle of the Aguadores
July 1, 1898 Battle of El Caney
July 1, 1898 Battle of San Juan Hill
July 1, 1898 Second Battle of Manzanillo
July 3, 1898 Battle of Santiago de Cuba
July 3–17, 1898 Siege of Santiago
July 18, 1898 Third Battle of Manzanillo
July 21, 1898 Battle of Nipe Bay
July 23, 1898 Battle of Rio Manimani
1898–1934 Banana Wars
1906–1909 United States occupation of Cuba
1912 Negro Rebellion
1917–1922 Sugar Intervention
1953 1952 Cuban coup d'état
1953–1959 Cuban Revolutionary War
July 26, 1953 Attack on Moncada Barracks
March 13, 1957 Havana Presidential Palace attack (1957)
May 28, 1957 Attack on El Uvero
June 28 – August 8, 1958 Operation Verano
July 11–21, 1958 Battle of La Plata
July 29 – August 8, 1958 Battle of Las Mercedes
November 20, 1958 Battle of Guisa
December 19–30, 1958 Battle of Yaguajay
December 28, 1958 – January 1, 1959 Battle of Santa Clara
1959-1965 Escambray Rebellion
April 17–19, 1961 Bay of Pigs Invasion
October 16–29, 1962 Cuban Missile Crisis
1994 Maleconazo
2021 – present 2021 Cuban protests

Saint Martin 
1568–1648 Eighty Years' War
June 1633 Capture of Saint Martin
1644 Attack on Saint Martin

Tobago 
1672–1678 Franco-Dutch War
March 1677 Action of March 1677
1970 Black Power Revolution
1990 Jamaat al Muslimeen coup attempt

Haiti 
April 20, 1792 – March 25, 1802 French Revolutionary Wars
1791–1804 Haitian Revolution
1798 War of Knives
1801 Battle of Ravine-à-Couleuvres
4–24 March 1802 Battle of Crête-à-Pierrot
November 18, 1803 Battle of Vertières

July 28, 1915 – August 1, 1934 United States occupation of Haiti
October 24–25, 1915 Battle of Fort Dipitie
November 17, 1915 Battle of Fort Rivière
October 6 or 7, 1919 Battle of Port-au-Prince (1919)
January 15, 1920 Battle of Port-au-Prince (1920)
October 1937 Parsley Massacre
1991 1991 Haitian coup d'etat
1994–1995 Operation Uphold Democracy
2004 2004 Haitian coup d'état
2018 – present 2018–2021 Haitian protests

Jamaica 
1654–1660 Anglo-Spanish War
May 19–27, 1655 Invasion of Jamaica
1934–1939 British West Indian labour unrest
1943–present Jamaican political conflict
2010 2010 Kingston unrest

Grenada 
1973–1983 New Jewel Movement
1983 Invasion of Grenada

Anguilla 
1969 Operation Sheepskin

See also 
Colonization of the Americas
List of conflicts in Africa
List of conflicts in Asia
List of conflicts in Central America
List of conflicts in Europe
List of conflicts in South America
List of conflicts in the Middle East
List of conflicts in the Near East
List of riots and civil unrest in Calgary
List of wars
Military history of Mexico
Military history of North America

References

Conflicts
Lists of military conflicts
North America
Military history of North America